The Nokia N800 Internet tablet is a wireless Internet appliance from Nokia, originally announced at the Las Vegas CES 2007 Summit in January 2007. N800 allows the user to browse the Internet and communicate using Wi-Fi networks or with mobile phone via Bluetooth. The N800 was developed as the successor to the Nokia 770. It includes FM and Internet radio, an RSS news reader, image viewer and a media player for audio and video files.

Specifications 

 Processor: OMAP2420 microprocessor with a native speed of 400 MHz 
 Runs at an underclocked 330 MHz on OS2007, because the DSP speed will be halved if run at full speed
 Runs at the native 400 MHz on OS2008.
 Memory: 128 MiB of RAM and 256 MiB of flash memory.
 Connectivity: IEEE 802.11 b/g, Bluetooth 2.0 (DUN, OPP, FTP, HFP, HID profiles as well as A2DP/AVRCP and PAN via third party emulation), and USB 2.0 OTG high-speed.
 Display & resolution: pressure-sensitive resistive touch-screen LCD 4.1 inches 800×480 pixels at 225 dpi (the same as the 770.) 
 includes PowerVR MBX acceleration, but the operating system does not include a device driver 
 Expansion: 2 full-sized Secure Digital card slots, one internal and one external, each accommodating one card up to 32 GB capacity when using SDHC. Only cards up to 8 GB are officially supported by Nokia.
 Camera: built-in pop-up rotating webcam. (note the camera does not rotate a full 360 degrees).
 Audio: microphone, stereo speakers, FM radio tuner, 3.5-mm headphone jack (compatible with standard stereo headphones, but also containing a fourth pin with microphone input). The headphone jack also functions as the antenna for the FM radio.
 Operating system: Linux-based Internet Tablet OS 2007. In December 2007 the new OS 2008 was released for the Nokia N800 and the Nokia N810.
 The N800 supports Skype internet calls and Flash Player 9 as of 6 July 2007, which allows users to watch YouTube videos, play online flash games, and make free internet calls to other Skype-enabled devices.

Note that the USB port uses a mini-B socket instead of mini-AB so that a specially grounded adaptor is required to make full use of the USB OTG client/host auto-switching. Switching can be done in software with regular adaptors, though. USB OTG only provides 100 mA of current (versus full-size USB's 500 mA), so devices with larger current requirements will need to be used with a powered USB hub.

Maemo 

The N800, like all Nokia Internet Tablets, runs Maemo, which is similar to many handheld operating systems, and provides a "Home" screen—the central point from which all applications and settings are accessed. The Home screen is divided into areas for launching applications, a menu bar, and a large customisable area that can display information such as an RSS reader, Internet radio player, and Google search box for example. Maemo is a modified version of Debian.

The N800 is bundled with several applications including the Mozilla-based MicroB browser, Macromedia Flash, Gizmo, and Skype.
The N800 use Maemo OS that comes with a number of built-in applications, but additional applications can be installed from a number of sources, including various official and community.

See also 

 Maemo (operating system)
 Internet appliance

Notes

External links 
 Nokia N800 Product Page
 Nokia N800 at Wikispecs

Nokia Internet tablets
Embedded Linux
Mobile computers
Linux-based devices
Computer-related introductions in 2007
Nokia Nseries